Xu Yonglai (born August 16, 1954 –) is a Chinese football player who played for China in the 1980 Asian Cup.

Career statistics

International statistics

References

External links
Team China Stats

Chinese footballers
China international footballers
1980 AFC Asian Cup players
Shandong Taishan F.C. players
Qingdao Hainiu F.C. (1990) managers
Living people
1954 births
Association football forwards
Chinese football managers